Messiter is a surname. Notable people with the surname include:

 Ian Messiter (1920–1999), British radio producer
 Malcolm Messiter (born 1949), British oboist
 Vivian Messiter, victim in the 1929 Podmore case